Tsaghkunk (also Romanized as Tsaghkunk’, Tsaghkunq, and Tsakhkunk; until 1946, Abdurahman; formerly, Verkhnyaya Aylanlu and Verin Aylanlu) is a town in the Armavir Province of Armenia. The town's church dates from the 19th century.

See also 
Armavir Province

References 
 
 World Gazeteer: Armenia – World-Gazetteer.com
 
 
 

Populated places in Armavir Province